Esil District is a district of North Kazakhstan Region in northern Kazakhstan. The administrative center of the district is the selo of Yavlenka. Population:

References

Districts of Kazakhstan
North Kazakhstan Region